Ian Ewart Alger (June 20, 1926, Oshawa, Ontario – February 21, 2009, New York City) was an innovative psychotherapist who was an early adopter of using videotape as a tool in therapy.

References 

1926 births
2009 deaths
American psychotherapists
University of Toronto alumni
Canadian emigrants to the United States